The Polytechnic University of Nicaragua (UPOLI) is a university in Managua, Nicaragua. It was founded in 1967.

Organization
The university has six schools:

 School of Administration, Commerce and Finance
 School of Law
 School of Design
 School of Nursing
 School of Engineering
 Music Conservatory

Online division
UPOLI International (Spanish: Universidad Politecnica de Nicaragua Internacional) is the online division. UPOLI International was established in 2013 by Tomás H. Téllez Ruiz, MSc., of the Polytechnic University of Nicaragua and Ricky M. Andrew, MBA.

See also 
Education in Nicaragua
List of universities in Nicaragua

External links
  
 UPOLI International website

UPOLI
Nursing schools in Nicaragua
Educational institutions established in 1967
1967 establishments in North America